The Blainville-Boisbriand Armada is a junior ice hockey team of the Quebec Major Junior Hockey League. The team is based in Boisbriand, Quebec, Canada, and plays its home games at the Centre d'Excellence Sports Rousseau.

History
The Armada started as the St. John's Fog Devils when Newfoundland was granted an expansion franchise. The team was sold to a group intending to move it to Montreal for the 2008–09 season where it became the Montreal Junior Hockey Club. In June 2011, the Quebec Major Junior Hockey League approved the sale of the Juniors to a group led by former NHL defenceman Joël Bouchard, who moved the team to Boisbriand, Quebec, for the 2011–12 season. On July 12, 2011, the team unveiled its new name, logo and colours.

In 2018, head coach and general manager Joël Bouchard was hired by the Montreal Canadiens to coach their minor league affiliate in the American Hockey League, the Laval Rocket for the 2018–19 season.

Season-by-season records
Note: GP = Games played, W = Wins, L = Losses, T = Ties, OTL = Overtime losses, Pts = Points, GF = Goals for, GA = Goals against, PIM = Penalties in minutes, TG = Playoff series decided on total goals

References

External links
Armada website

Quebec Major Junior Hockey League teams
Ice hockey teams in Quebec
Boisbriand
2011 establishments in Quebec
Ice hockey clubs established in 2011